The Qualicum River or Big Qualicum River ("Where the Dog Salmon Run" in the Pentlatch language) is a river on the east coast of Vancouver Island, British Columbia, Canada, flowing northeast from its headwaters in Horne Lake into the Strait of Georgia just south of Qualicum Bay, near the town of Qualicum Beach.  The river's name comes from that of the Qualicum people.

References

Rivers of Vancouver Island
Mid Vancouver Island